Dogtown is a ghost town in Lafayette County, Mississippi, United States, located on Highway 334,  southeast of Oxford.  At one time it was the location of Dogtown School.

All that remains of Dogtown is the abandoned White's Grocery.

References

Former populated places in Lafayette County, Mississippi
Ghost towns in Mississippi